Ko Tin Lung (1954 – 23 June 2022) was a Hong Kong actor, director and radio presenter. He won four Hong Kong Drama Awards in the categories Best Actor and Best Director. Ko directed the stage play I Have a Date With Spring, which was adapted into a film by Clifton Ko. He died in June 2022 in his sleep at the age of 69.

Life
Ko Tin Lung grew up in Wong Tai Sin District, Kowloon in his early years. He attended Choi Po Sin School (Primary Section), Fatima English Primary School and St. Francis Xavier's College.  Organize school drama activities together.  When Ko Tin Lung was in the second grade of elementary school, he was selected by the teacher to perform the white swan spoon dance at the Kai Tak Playground.  Later, because once the principal blamed a certain classmate in the classroom for being too noisy, Ko Tin Lung stepped forward, which made the principal leave a bad image of Ko.  Ji College entered the preparatory course, and finally prompted him to transfer to Xinfa College to complete the sixth form preparatory course and was admitted to the Chinese University of Hong Kong.  He graduated from the Sociology Department of Chung Chi College. His interest in drama began in middle school, and he was accompanied by drama throughout his middle school and university days.  When I was in college, I was warned by the school because I often skipped classes to rehearse plays.  After obtaining a university degree in 1979, he studied the Diploma of Education of the University of Hong Kong, and also served as an English and economics teacher at Chan Shu Kui Memorial Secondary School. It was not until 1983 that he joined the Hong Kong Repertory Theater as a full-time actor and started a full-time drama career.

When Ko Tin Lung first joined the Hong Kong Repertory Theater, he only worked as an actor, and later participated in the writing and directing of some short plays.  The first self-written and directed stage play is called "Between Teachers and Students".  In 1988, he received a scholarship from the Asian Cultural Council to study in New York, USA; he returned to Hong Kong a year later and was promoted to Assistant Artistic Director of the Hong Kong Repertory Theatre.  In 1993, he transferred to the Chung Ying Theater Company as the artistic director, becoming the troupe's first Chinese artistic director.  He has successively served as the editor, director and actor of many dramas. Among them, "I Have a Date with Spring" and "The Thirteen Langs of the South China Sea" co-operated with To Kwok-wai are the most successful.  stage play.

On June 23, 2022, Ko Tin Lung was found to have passed away in his sleep. The news of his death was announced by Du Guowei on the same day. The police believed that the incident was not suspicious and the cause of death could not be confirmed yet.

Filmography

Film

References 

Year of birth missing
1950s births
2022 deaths
Hong Kong male film actors
Hong Kong male stage actors
Hong Kong directors
Hong Kong radio presenters
Hong Kong Drama Awards winners
20th-century Hong Kong actors
21st-century Hong Kong actors